Langelurillus sibandai is a jumping spider species in the genus Langelurillus that lives in Zimbabwe. The female was described by Wanda Wesołowska in 2011; the male has yet to be described.

References

Salticidae
Endemic fauna of Zimbabwe
Spiders of Africa
Spiders described in 2011
Taxa named by Wanda Wesołowska